Hesar-e Kazimabad (also Romanized as Ḩeşār-e Kāẓimābād) is a village in Milanlu Rural District, in the Central District of Esfarayen County, North Khorasan Province, Iran. At the 2006 census, its population was 28, in 7 families.

References 

Populated places in Esfarayen County